Pine Log Creek is a stream in the U.S. state of Georgia It begins in Cherokee County, flows northwesterly through Bartow County, and then ends in Gordon County as a tributary of Salacoa Creek. Little Pine Log Creek is a tributary that joins it in Gordon County.

Pine Log Creek was named after the pine foot log at a Cherokee village along its course.

References

Rivers of Georgia (U.S. state)
Rivers of Bartow County, Georgia
Rivers of Cherokee County, Georgia
Rivers of Gordon County, Georgia